West Quincy may refer to:

West Quincy (Quincy, Massachusetts), a neighborhood of Quincy
West Quincy, Missouri, a commercial area in Marion County, Missouri